Fasana is an Italian surname. Notable people with this surname include:

 John Fasana,  mayor of Duarte, California
 Erika Fasana (born 1996), Italian artistic gymnast

See also
 Fasana (disambiguation)
 Fasano (surname)

Italian-language surnames